The 2013 Avon Tyres British GT season was the 21st season of the British GT Championship. The season began on 30 March at Oulton Park and finished on 6 October at Donington Park, after ten rounds held over seven meetings. Beechdean Motorsport team principal Andrew Howard won the GT3 category in an Aston Martin V12 Vantage GT3, Optimum Motorsport's Ryan Ratcliffe and Rick Parfitt Jr. won the GT4 championship, driving a Ginetta G50 while Paul Bailey and Andy Schulz took the GTC title in a Ferrari 458 Challenge, driving for Horsepower Racing.

Entry list
The SRO released the entry list on 7 March at the season launch, containing 27 GT3 and 6 GT4 full season entries.

Race calendar and results
The 2013 calendar was announced on 13 September 2012. A revised calendar was released on 6 December 2012, with Zandvoort replacing the Nürburgring. All races except Dutch round at Zandvoort, were held in the United Kingdom.

Championship standings
Points are awarded as follows:

GT3/GTC

GT4

Notes

References

External links
British GT website

GT
British GT Championship seasons